Stefen Daniel Romero (born October 17, 1988) is an American professional baseball right fielder for the Diablos Rojos del México of the Mexican League. He has played in Major League Baseball (MLB) for the Seattle Mariners in Nippon Professional Baseball (NPB) for the Tohoku Rakuten Golden Eagles and Orix Buffaloes.

Career

Amateur
Romero attended Sunnyside High School in Tucson, Arizona. Playing for the school's baseball team, he earned an all-southern Arizona honorable mention from the Tucson Citizen following his senior season. He also played for the school's basketball team.

Romero enrolled at Pima Community College. After playing college baseball at Pima for two years, he transferred to Oregon State University, where he played for the Oregon State Beavers baseball team. In 2009, he played collegiate summer baseball with the Bourne Braves of the Cape Cod Baseball League. He had a .326 batting average in 2010, and was named to the All-Pac-10 Conference First Team.

Seattle Mariners
The Seattle Mariners selected Romero in the 12th round of the 2010 Major League Baseball Draft. He made his professional debut in 2011 with the Single-A Clinton LumberKings, logging a .280/.342/.462 slash line with 16 home runs and 65 RBI.

In 2012, Romero was the Mariners Minor League Player of the Year after he hit .352/.391/.599 with 23 home runs and 101 runs batted in with the Jackson Generals of the Class AA Southern League. He was assigned to the Tacoma Rainiers of the Class AAA Pacific Coast League in 2013, but started the season on the disabled list with an oblique injury. Romero was added to the Mariners 40-man roster on November 20, 2013.

In 2014, Romero made the Mariners' Opening Day roster, and had his major league debut on April 1. He struggled, batting .192 in 73 games. He began the 2015 season in Tacoma, playing in 116 games for the team, and also went 4-for-21 in 24 plate appearances for the Mariners. He began the 2016 season in Tacoma, and went 4-for-17 in 19 plate appearances for the Mariners that year.

On November 19, 2016, the Mariners released Romero to pursue an opportunity to play in Japan.

Orix Buffaloes
He signed with the Orix Buffaloes of Nippon Professional Baseball's Pacific League on November 24, 2016. In 2017, Romero slashed .274/.330/.508 with 26 home runs and 66 RBI. He signed a three-year contract extension with the Buffaloes on August 4, 2017, earning $2.5 million per season. In 2018, Romero batted .237/.313/.451 with 25 home runs and 63 RBI. In 2019, Romero played in 81 games for Orix, batting .305/.363/.539 with 18 home runs and 63 RBI. On December 2, 2019, he became a free agent.

Tohoku Rakuten Golden Eagles
On January 27, 2020, Romero signed with the Rakuten Golden Eagles of Nippon Professional Baseball(NPB). On February 15, 2020, he held press conference. On the year, Romero slashed .272/.354/.539 with 24 home runs and 63 RBI for Rakuten. On December 2, 2020, he became a free agent.

Second stint with the Buffaloes
On January 8, 2021, Romero signed a one-year contract to return to the Orix Buffaloes of NPB. Due to the influence of COVID-19, he was in a situation where his family could not come to Japan and lived away from his family. The Buffaloes acknowledged his desire to prioritize his family and he decided to leave the team on August 3.

Los Angeles Dodgers
On February 12, 2022, Romero signed a minor league contract with the Los Angeles Dodgers. After beginning the season with the Triple-A Oklahoma City Dodgers he was added to the major league roster on June 22. He was designated for assignment on June 25, without appearing in a game. He played in 30 games for Oklahoma City, hitting .265/.353/.431 with 3 home runs and 22 RBI before he was placed on the injured list on July 9 and stayed there the rest of the season. He elected free agency on November 10, 2022.

Diablos Rojos del México
On March 6, 2023, Romero signed with the Diablos Rojos del México of the Mexican League.

Personal life
Stefen's younger brother, Santiago, was a teammate on their high school baseball team.

References

External links

Oregon State Beavers bio
 Career statistics - NPB.jp

1988 births
Living people
American expatriate baseball players in Japan
American baseball players of Mexican descent
Baseball players from Tucson, Arizona
Bourne Braves players
Clinton LumberKings players
High Desert Mavericks players
Jackson Generals (Southern League) players
Major League Baseball outfielders
Nippon Professional Baseball outfielders
Oregon State Beavers baseball players
Orix Buffaloes players
Peoria Javelinas players
Pima Aztecs baseball players
Seattle Mariners players
Tacoma Rainiers players
Tohoku Rakuten Golden Eagles players
Oklahoma City Dodgers players